Cirrhosis, also known as liver cirrhosis or hepatic cirrhosis, and end-stage liver disease, is the impaired liver function caused by the formation of scar tissue known as fibrosis due to damage caused by liver disease. Damage causes tissue repair and subsequent formation of scar tissue, which over time can replace normal functioning tissue, leading to the impaired liver function of cirrhosis. The disease typically develops slowly over months or years. Early symptoms may include tiredness, weakness, loss of appetite, unexplained weight loss, nausea and vomiting, and discomfort in the right upper quadrant of the abdomen. As the disease worsens, symptoms may include itchiness, swelling in the lower legs, fluid build-up in the abdomen, jaundice, bruising easily, and the development of spider-like blood vessels in the skin. The fluid build-up in the abdomen may become spontaneously infected. More serious complications include hepatic encephalopathy, bleeding from dilated veins in the esophagus, stomach, or intestines, and liver cancer.

Cirrhosis is most commonly caused by alcoholic liver disease, non-alcoholic steatohepatitis (NASH – the progressive form of non-alcoholic fatty liver disease), heroin abuse, chronic hepatitis B, and chronic hepatitis C. Heavy drinking over a number of years can cause alcoholic liver disease. Liver damage has also been attributed to heroin usage over an extended period of time as well. NASH has a number of causes, including obesity, high blood pressure, abnormal levels of cholesterol, type 2 diabetes, and metabolic syndrome. Less common causes of cirrhosis include autoimmune hepatitis, primary biliary cholangitis, and primary sclerosing cholangitis that disrupts bile duct function, genetic disorders such as Wilson's disease and hereditary hemochromatosis, and chronic heart failure with liver congestion.

Diagnosis is based on blood tests, medical imaging, and liver biopsy.

Hepatitis B vaccine can prevent hepatitis B and the development of cirrhosis, but no vaccination against hepatitis C is available. No specific treatment for cirrhosis is known, but many of the underlying causes may be treated by a number of medications that may slow or prevent worsening of the condition. Avoiding alcohol is recommended in all cases. Hepatitis B and C may be treatable with antiviral medications. Autoimmune hepatitis may be treated with steroid medications. Ursodiol may be useful if the disease is due to blockage of the bile duct. Other medications may be useful for complications such as abdominal or leg swelling, hepatic encephalopathy, and dilated esophageal veins. If cirrhosis leads to liver failure, a liver transplant may be an option.

Cirrhosis affected about 2.8 million people and resulted in 1.3 million deaths in 2015. Of these deaths, alcohol caused 348,000, hepatitis C caused 326,000, and hepatitis B caused 371,000. In the United States, more men die of cirrhosis than women. The first known description of the condition is by Hippocrates in the fifth century BCE. The term "cirrhosis" was derived in 1819 from the Greek word "kirrhos," which describes the yellowish color of a diseased liver.

Signs and symptoms

Cirrhosis can take quite a long time to develop, and symptoms may be slow to emerge. Some early symptoms include tiredness, weakness, loss of appetite, weight loss, and nausea. People may also feel discomfort in the right upper abdomen around the liver.

As cirrhosis progresses, symptoms can include neurological changes. This can consist of cognitive impairments, confusion, memory loss, sleep disorders, and personality changes.

Worsening cirrhosis can cause a build-up of fluid in different parts of the body such as the legs (edema) and abdomen (ascites). Other signs of advancing disease include itchy skin, bruising easily, dark urine, and yellowing of the skin.

Liver dysfunction
These features are a direct consequence of liver cells not functioning:
 Spider angiomata or spider nevi happen when there is dilatation of vasculature beneath the skin surface. There is a central, red spot with reddish extensions that radiate outward. This creates a visual effect that resembles a spider. It occurs in about one-third of cases. The likely cause is an increase in estrogen. Cirrhosis causes a rise of estrogen due to increased conversion of androgens into estrogen.
 Palmar erythema presents as reddish palms below the thumb and little finger. This is seen in about 23% of cirrhosis cases. This is a result of increased estrogen.
 Gynecomastia, or the increase of breast size in men, is caused by increased estradiol (a potent type of estrogen). This can occur in up to two-thirds of cases.
 Hypogonadism signifies a decreased functionality of the gonads. This can result in impotence, infertility, loss of sexual drive, and testicular atrophy. A swollen scrotum may also be evident.
 Liver size can be enlarged, normal, or shrunken in people with cirrhosis. As the disease progresses, the liver will typically shrink due to the result of scarring.
 Jaundice is the yellowing of the skin. It can additionally cause yellowing of mucous membranes notably of the white of the eyes. This phenomenon is due to increased levels of bilirubin, which may also cause the urine to be dark-colored.

Portal hypertension

Liver cirrhosis makes it hard for blood to flow in the portal venous system. This resistance creates a backup of blood and increases pressure. This results in portal hypertension. Effects of portal hypertension include:
 Ascites is a build-up of fluid in the peritoneal cavity in the abdomen
 An enlarged spleen in 35 to 50% of cases
 Esophageal varices and gastric varices result from collateral circulation in the esophagus and stomach (a process called portacaval anastomosis). When the blood vessels in this circulation become enlarged, they are called varices. Varices are more likely to rupture at this point. Variceal rupture often leads to severe bleeding, which can be fatal.
 Caput medusae are dilated paraumbilical collateral veins due to portal hypertension. Blood from the portal venous system may be forced through the paraumbilical veins and ultimately to the abdominal wall veins. The created pattern resembles the head of Medusa, hence the name.
 Cruveilhier-Baumgarten bruit is bruit in the epigastric region (on examination by stethoscope). It is due to extra connections forming between the portal system and the paraumbilical veins.

Other nonspecific signs
Some signs that may be present include changes in the nails (such as Muehrcke's lines, Terry's nails, and nail clubbing). Additional changes may be seen in the hands (Dupuytren's contracture) as well as the skin/bones (hypertrophic osteoarthropathy).

Advanced disease
As the disease progresses, complications may develop. In some people, these may be the first signs of the disease.
 Bruising and bleeding can result from decreased production of clotting factors
 Hepatic encephalopathy (HE) occurs when ammonia and related substances build up in the blood. This build-up affects brain function when they are not cleared from the blood by the liver. Symptoms can include unresponsiveness, forgetfulness, trouble concentrating, changes in sleep habits, or psychosis. One classic physical examination finding is asterixis. This is the asynchronous flapping of outstretched, dorsiflexed hands. Fetor hepaticus is a musty breath odor resulting from increased dimethyl sulfide and is a feature of HE.
 Sensitivity to medication can be caused by decreased metabolism of the active compounds
 Acute kidney injury (particularly hepatorenal syndrome) 
 Cachexia associated with muscle wasting and weakness

Causes
Cirrhosis has many possible causes, and more than one cause may be present. History taking is of importance in trying to determine the most likely cause. Globally, 57% of cirrhosis is attributable to either hepatitis B (30%) or hepatitis C (27%). Alcohol use disorder is another major cause, accounting for about 20-40% of the cases.

Common causes

 Alcoholic liver disease (ALD, or alcoholic cirrhosis) develops for 10–20% of individuals who drink heavily for a decade or more. Alcohol seems to injure the liver by blocking the normal metabolism of protein, fats, and carbohydrates. This injury happens through the formation of acetaldehyde from alcohol. Acetaldehyde is reactive and leads to the accumulation of other reactive products in the liver.  People with ALD may also have concurrent alcoholic hepatitis. Associated symptoms are fever, hepatomegaly, jaundice, and anorexia. AST and ALT blood levels are both elevated, but at less than 300 IU/liter, with an AST:ALT ratio > 2.0, a value rarely seen in other liver diseases. In the United States, 40% of cirrhosis-related deaths are due to alcohol.
 In non-alcoholic fatty liver disease (NAFLD), fat builds up in the liver and eventually causes scar tissue. This type of disorder can be caused by obesity, diabetes, malnutrition, coronary artery disease, and steroids. Though similar in signs to alcoholic liver disease, no history of notable alcohol use is found. Blood tests and medical imaging are used to diagnose NAFLD and NASH, and sometimes a liver biopsy is needed.
 Chronic hepatitis C, an infection with the hepatitis C virus, causes inflammation of the liver and a variable grade of damage to the organ. Over several decades, this inflammation and damage can lead to cirrhosis. Among patients with chronic hepatitis C, 20–30% develop cirrhosis. Cirrhosis caused by hepatitis C and alcoholic liver disease are the most common reasons for liver transplant. Both hepatitis C and hepatitis B-related cirrhosis can also be attributed with heroin addiction.
 Chronic hepatitis B causes liver inflammation and injury that over several decades can lead to cirrhosis. Hepatitis D is dependent on the presence of hepatitis B and accelerates cirrhosis in co-infection.

Less common causes
 In primary biliary cholangitis (previously known as primary biliary cirrhosis), the bile ducts become damaged by an autoimmune process. This leads to  liver damage. Patients may have no symptoms. While other people could present with fatigue, pruritus, or skin hyperpigmentation. The liver is typically enlarged which is referred to as hepatomegaly. Rises in alkaline phosphatase, cholesterol, and bilirubin levels occur. Patients are usually positive for anti-mitochondrial antibodies.
 Primary sclerosing cholangitis is a disorder of the bile ducts that presents with pruritus, steatorrhea, fat-soluble vitamin deficiencies, and metabolic bone disease. A strong association with inflammatory bowel disease is seen, especially ulcerative colitis.
 Autoimmune hepatitis is caused by an attack of the liver by lymphocytes. This causes inflammation and eventually scarring as well as cirrhosis. Findings include elevations in serum globulins, especially gamma globulins.
 Hereditary hemochromatosis usually presents with skin hyperpigmentation, diabetes mellitus, pseudogout, or cardiomyopathy, All of these are due to signs of iron overload. Family history of cirrhosis is common as well.
 Wilson's disease is an autosomal recessive disorder characterized by low ceruloplasmin in the blood and increased copper of the liver. Copper in the urine is also elevated. Patients may also have Kayser-Fleischer rings in the cornea and altered mental status.
 Indian childhood cirrhosis is a form of neonatal cholestasis characterized by deposition of copper in the liver 
 Alpha-1 antitrypsin deficiency  is an autosomal co-dominant disorder of low levels of the enzyme alpha-1 antitrypsin
 Cardiac cirrhosis is due to chronic right-sided heart failure, which leads to liver congestion 
 Galactosemia
 Glycogen storage disease type IV
 Cystic fibrosis
 Hepatotoxic drugs or toxins, such as acetaminophen (paracetamol), methotrexate, or amiodarone

Pathophysiology
The liver plays a vital role in the synthesis of proteins (for example, albumin, clotting factors and complement), detoxification, and storage (for example, of vitamin A and glycogen). In addition, it participates in the metabolism of lipids and carbohydrates.

Cirrhosis is often preceded by hepatitis and fatty liver (steatosis), independent of the cause. If the cause is removed at this stage, the changes are fully reversible.

The pathological hallmark of cirrhosis is the development of scar tissue that replaces normal tissue. This scar tissue blocks the portal flow of blood through the organ, raising the blood pressure and disturbing normal function. Research has shown the pivotal role of the stellate cell, that normally stores vitamin A, in the development of cirrhosis. Damage to the liver tissue from inflammation leads to the activation of stellate cells, which increases fibrosis through the production of myofibroblasts, and obstructs hepatic blood flow. In addition, stellate cells secrete TGF beta 1, which leads to a fibrotic response and proliferation of connective tissue. TGF-β1 have been implicated in the process of activating hepatic stellate cells (HSCs) with the magnitude of fibrosis being in proportion to increase in TGF β levels.  ACTA2 is associated with TGF β pathway that enhances contractile properties of HSCs leading to fibrosis. Furthermore, it secretes TIMP1 and TIMP2, naturally occurring inhibitors of matrix metalloproteinases, which prevents them from breaking down the fibrotic material in the extracellular matrix.

As this cascade of processes continues, fibrous tissue bands (septa) separate hepatocyte nodules, which eventually replace the entire liver architecture, leading to decreased blood flow throughout. The spleen becomes congested, and enlarged, resulting in its retention of platelets, which are needed for normal blood clotting. Portal hypertension is responsible for the most severe complications of cirrhosis.

Diagnosis

The diagnosis of cirrhosis in an individual is based on multiple factors. Cirrhosis may be suspected from laboratory findings, physical exam, and patient history. Imaging is generally obtained to evaluate the liver. A liver biopsy will confirm the diagnosis; however, is generally not required.

Imaging
Ultrasound is routinely used in the evaluation of cirrhosis. It may show a small and shrunken liver in advanced disease.  On ultrasound, there is increased echogenicity with irregular appearing areas. Other suggestive findings are an enlarged caudate lobe, widening of the fissures and enlargement of the spleen. An enlarged spleen, which normally measures less than 11–12 cm in adults, may suggest underlying portal hypertension. Ultrasound may also screen for hepatocellular carcinoma and portal hypertension. This is done by assessing flow in the hepatic vein. An increased portal vein pulsatility may be seen. However, this may be a sign of elevated right atrial pressure. Portal vein pulsatility are usually measured by a pulsatility indices (PI). A number above a certain values indicates cirrhosis (see table below).
Other scans include CT of the abdomen and MRI. A CT scan is non-invasive and may be helpful in the diagnosis. Compared to the ultrasound, CT scans tend to be more expensive. MRI provides excellent evaluation; however, is a high expense.

Cirrhosis is also diagnosable through a variety of new elastography techniques. When a liver becomes cirrhotic it will generally become stiffer. Determining the stiffness through imaging can determine the location and severity of disease. Techniques include transient elastography, acoustic radiation force impulse imaging, supersonic shear imaging and magnetic resonance elastography. Transient elastography and magnetic resonance elastography can help identify the stage of fibrosis. Compared to a biopsy, elastography can sample a much larger area and is painless. It shows a reasonable correlation with the severity of cirrhosis. Other modalities have been introduced which are incorporated into ultrasonagraphy systems. These include 2-dimensional shear wave elastography and point shear wave elastography which uses acoustic radiation force impulse imaging.

Rarely are diseases of the bile ducts, such as primary sclerosing cholangitis, causes of cirrhosis. Imaging of the bile ducts, such as ERCP or MRCP (MRI of biliary tract and pancreas) may aid in the diagnosis.

Lab findings 
The best predictors of cirrhosis are ascites, platelet count < 160,000/mm3, spider angiomata, and a Bonacini cirrhosis discriminant score greater than 7 (as the sum of scores for platelet count, ALT/AST ratio and INR as per table).

These findings are typical in cirrhosis:
 Thrombocytopenia, typically multifactorial, is due to alcoholic marrow suppression, sepsis, lack of folate, platelet sequestering in the spleen, and decreased thrombopoietin. However, this rarely results in a platelet count < 50 000/mL.
 Aminotransferases  AST and ALT are moderately elevated, with AST > ALT. However, normal aminotransferase levels do not preclude cirrhosis.
 Alkaline phosphatase – slightly elevated but less than 2–3 times the upper limit of normal.
 Gamma-glutamyl transferase – correlates with AP levels. Typically much higher in chronic liver disease from alcohol.
 Bilirubin levels are normal when compensated, but may elevate as cirrhosis progresses.
 Albumin  levels fall as the synthetic function of the liver declines with worsening cirrhosis since albumin is exclusively synthesized in the liver.
 Prothrombin time increases, since the liver synthesizes clotting factors.
 Globulins increase due to shunting of bacterial antigens away from the liver to lymphoid tissue.
 Serum sodium levels fall(hyponatremia) due to inability to excrete free water resulting from high levels of ADH and aldosterone.
 Leukopenia and neutropenia are due to splenomegaly with splenic margination.
 Coagulation defects occur, as the liver produces most of the coagulation factors, thus coagulopathy correlates with worsening liver disease.
 Glucagon is increased in cirrhosis.
 Vasoactive intestinal peptide is increased as blood is shunted into the intestinal system because of portal hypertension.
 Vasodilators are increased (such as nitric oxide and carbon monoxide) reducing afterload with compensatory increase in cardiac output, mixed venous oxygen saturation.
 Renin is increased (as well as sodium retention in kidneys) secondary to a fall in systemic vascular resistance.

FibroTest is a biomarker for fibrosis that may be used instead of a biopsy.

Other laboratory studies performed in newly diagnosed cirrhosis may include:
 Serology for hepatitis viruses, autoantibodies (ANA, antismooth muscle, antimitochondria, anti-LKM)
 Ferritin and transferrin saturation: markers of iron overload as in hemochromatosis, copper and ceruloplasmin: markers of copper overload as in Wilson's disease
 Immunoglobulin levels (IgG, IgM, IgA) – these immunoglobins are nonspecific, but may help in distinguishing various causes.
 Cholesterol and glucose
 Alpha 1-antitrypsin

Markers of inflammation and immune cell activation are typically elevated in cirrhotic patients, especially in the decompensated disease stage:
 C-reactive protein (CRP)
 Procalcitonin (PCT)
 Presepsin
 soluble CD14
 soluble CD163
 soluble CD206 (mannose receptor)
 soluble TREM-1
A recent study identified15 microbial biomarkers from the gut microbiota. These could potentially be used to discriminate patients with liver cirrhosis from healthy individuals.

Pathology

The gold standard for diagnosis of cirrhosis is a liver biopsy. This is usually carried out as a fine-needle approach, through the skin (percutaneous), or internal jugular vein (transjugular). Endoscopic ultrasound-guided liver biopsy (EUS), using the percutaneous or transjugular route, has become a good alternative to use. EUS can target liver areas that are widely separated, and can deliver bi-lobar biopsies. A biopsy is not necessary if the clinical, laboratory, and radiologic data suggest cirrhosis. Furthermore, a small but significant risk of complications is associated with liver biopsy, and cirrhosis itself predisposes for complications caused by liver biopsy.

Once the biopsy is obtained, a pathologist will study the sample. Cirrhosis is defined by its features on microscopy: (1) the presence of regenerating nodules of hepatocytes and (2) the presence of fibrosis, or the deposition of connective tissue between these nodules. The pattern of fibrosis seen can depend on the underlying insult that led to cirrhosis. Fibrosis can also proliferate even if the underlying process that caused it has resolved or ceased. The fibrosis in cirrhosis can lead to destruction of other normal tissues in the liver: including the sinusoids, the space of Disse, and other vascular structures, which leads to altered resistance to blood flow in the liver, and portal hypertension.

As cirrhosis can be caused by many different entities which injure the liver in different ways, cause-specific abnormalities may be seen. For example, in chronic hepatitis B, there is infiltration of the liver parenchyma with lymphocytes. In congestive hepatopathy there are erythrocytes and a greater amount of fibrosis in the tissue surrounding the hepatic veins. In primary biliary cholangitis, there is fibrosis around the bile duct, the presence of granulomas and pooling of bile. Lastly in alcoholic cirrhosis, there is infiltration of the liver with neutrophils.

Macroscopically, the liver is initially enlarged, but with the progression of the disease, it becomes smaller. Its surface is irregular, the consistency is firm, and if associated with steatosis the color is yellow. Depending on the size of the nodules, there are three macroscopic types: micronodular, macronodular, and mixed cirrhosis. In the micronodular form (Laennec's cirrhosis or portal cirrhosis), regenerating nodules are under 3 mm. In macronodular cirrhosis (post-necrotic cirrhosis), the nodules are larger than 3 mm. Mixed cirrhosis consists of nodules of different sizes.

Grading 
The severity of cirrhosis is commonly classified with the Child–Pugh score (also known as the Child–Pugh–Turcotte score). This system was devised in 1964 by Child and Turcotte, and modified in 1973 by Pugh and others. It was first established to determine who would benefit from elective surgery for portal decompression.  This scoring system uses multiple lab values including bilirubin, albumin, and INR. The presence of ascites and severity of encephalopathy is also included in the scoring. Patients are classified into class A, B, or C. Class A has a favorable prognosis while class C is at high risk of death.

The Child-Pugh score is a validated predictor of mortality after a major surgery. For example, Child class A patients have a 10% mortality rate and Child class B patients have a 30% mortality rate while Child class C patients have a 70 to 80% mortality rate after abdominal surgery. Elective surgery is usually reserved for those in Child class A patients. There is an increased risk for child class B individuals and they may require medical optimization. Overall, it is not recommended for Child class C patients to undergo elective surgery.

In the past, the Child-Pugh classification was used to determine patients who were candidates for a liver transplant. Child-Pugh class B is usually an indication for evaluation for transplant. However, there were many issues when applying this score to liver transplant eligibility. Thus, the MELD score was created.

The Model for End-Stage Liver Disease (MELD) score was later developed and approved in 2002. It was approved by the United Network for Organ Sharing (UNOS) as a way to determine the allocation of liver transplants to awaiting people in the United States. It is also used as a validated survival predictor of cirrhosis, alcoholic hepatitis, acute liver failure, and acute hepatitis. The variables included bilirubin, INR, creatinine, and dialysis frequency. In 2016, sodium was added to the variables and the score is often referred to as MELD-Na.

MELD-Plus is a further risk score to assess severity of chronic liver disease. It was developed in 2017 as a result of a collaboration between Massachusetts General Hospital and IBM. Nine variables were identified as effective predictors for 90-day mortality after a discharge from a cirrhosis-related hospital admission. The variables include all Model for End-Stage Liver Disease (MELD)'s components, as well as sodium, albumin, total cholesterol, white blood cell count, age, and length of stay.

The hepatic venous pressure gradient (difference in venous pressure between incoming and outgoing blood to the liver) also determines the severity of cirrhosis, although it is hard to measure. A value of 16 mm or more means a greatly increased risk of death.

Prevention
Key prevention strategies for cirrhosis are population-wide interventions to reduce alcohol intake (through pricing strategies, public health campaigns, and personal counseling), programs to reduce the transmission of viral hepatitis, and screening of relatives of people with hereditary liver diseases.

Little is known about factors affecting cirrhosis risk and progression. However, many studies have provided increasing evidence for the protective effects of coffee consumption against the progression of liver disease. These effects are more noticeable in liver disease that is associated with alcohol use disorder. Coffee has antioxidant and antifibrotic effects. Caffeine may not be the important component; polyphenols may be more important. Drinking two or more cups of coffee a day is associated with improvements in the liver enzymes ALT, AST, and GGT. Even in those with liver disease, coffee consumption can lower fibrosis and cirrhosis.

Treatment
Generally, liver damage from cirrhosis cannot be reversed, but treatment can stop or delay further progression and reduce complications. A healthy diet is encouraged, as cirrhosis may be an energy-consuming process. A recommended diet consists of high-protein, high-fiber diet plus supplementation with branched-chain amino acids. Close follow-up is often necessary. Antibiotics are prescribed for infections, and various medications can help with itching. Laxatives, such as lactulose, decrease the risk of constipation. Carvedilol increases survival benefit for patients with cirrhosis and portal hypertension.

Alcoholic cirrhosis caused by alcohol use disorder is treated by abstaining from alcohol. Treatment for hepatitis-related cirrhosis involves medications used to treat the different types of hepatitis, such as interferon for viral hepatitis and corticosteroids for autoimmune hepatitis.

Cirrhosis caused by Wilson's disease is treated by removing the copper which builds up in organs. This is carried out using chelation therapy such as penicillamine. When the cause is an iron overload, iron is removed using a chelation agent such as deferoxamine or by bloodletting.

As of 2021, there are recent studies studying drugs to prevent cirrhosis caused by non-alcoholic fatty liver disease (NAFLD or NASH). A drug called semaglutide was shown to provide greater NASH resolution versus placebo. No improvement in fibrosis was observed. A combination of cilofexor/firsocostat was studied in patients with bridging fibrosis and cirrhosis. It was observed to have led to improvements in NASH activity with a potential antifibrotic effect. Lanifibranor is also shown to prevent worsening fibrosis.

Preventing further liver damage
Regardless of the underlying cause of cirrhosis, consumption of alcohol and other potentially damaging substances are discouraged. There is no evidence that supports the avoidance or dose reduction of paracetamol in people with compensated cirrhosis; it is thus considered a safe analgesic for said individuals.

Vaccination of susceptible patients should be considered for hepatitis A and hepatitis B.
Treating the cause of cirrhosis prevents further damage; for example, giving oral antivirals such as entecavir and tenofovir where cirrhosis is due to hepatitis B prevents progression of cirrhosis. Similarly, control of weight and diabetes prevents deterioration in cirrhosis due to non-alcoholic fatty liver disease.

Avoid drugs that could further harm the liver. These include several drugs such as anti-depressants, certain antibiotics, and NSAIDs (like ibuprofen). These agents are hepatotoxic as they are metabolized by the liver. If medication that harms the liver is still recommended by your doctor, the dosage can be adjusted.

Lifestyle 
According to a 2018 systematic review based on studies that implemented 8 to 14 week-long exercise programs, there is currently insufficient scientific evidence regarding either the beneficial or harmful effects of physical exercise in people with cirrhosis on all-cause mortality, morbidity (including both serious and non-serious adverse events), health-related quality of life, exercise capacity and anthropomorphic measures. These conclusions were based on low to very low quality research, which imposes the need to develop further research with higher quality, especially to evaluate its effects on clinical outcomes.

Transplantation

If complications cannot be controlled or when the liver ceases functioning, liver transplantation is necessary. Survival from liver transplantation has been improving over the 1990s, and the five-year survival rate is now around 80%. The survival rate depends largely on the severity of disease and other medical risk factors in the recipient. In the United States, the MELD score is used to prioritize patients for transplantation. Transplantation necessitates the use of immune suppressants (ciclosporin or tacrolimus).

Decompensated cirrhosis
Manifestations of decompensation in cirrhosis include gastrointestinal bleeding, hepatic encephalopathy, jaundice or ascites. In patients with previously stable cirrhosis, decompensation may occur due to various causes, such as constipation, infection (of any source), increased alcohol intake, medication, bleeding from esophageal varices or dehydration. It may take the form of any of the complications of cirrhosis listed below.

People with decompensated cirrhosis generally require admission to a hospital, with close monitoring of the fluid balance, mental status, and emphasis on adequate nutrition and medical treatment – often with diuretics, antibiotics, laxatives or enemas, thiamine and occasionally steroids, acetylcysteine and pentoxifylline. Administration of saline is avoided, as it would add to the already high total body sodium content that typically occurs in cirrhosis. Life expectancy without liver transplant is low, at most 3 years.

Palliative care
Palliative care is specialized medical care that focuses on providing patients with relief from the symptoms, pain, and stress of a serious illness, such as cirrhosis. The goal of palliative care is to improve quality of life for both the patient and the patient's family and it is appropriate at any stage and for any type of cirrhosis.

Especially in the later stages, people with cirrhosis experience significant symptoms such as abdominal swelling, itching, leg edema, and chronic abdominal pain which would be amenable for treatment through palliative care. Because the disease is not curable without a transplant, palliative care can also help with discussions regarding the person's wishes concerning health care power of attorney, do not resuscitate decisions and life support, and potentially hospice. Despite proven benefit, people with cirrhosis are rarely referred to palliative care.

Immunity 
Cirrhosis is known to cause immune dysfunction in numerous ways. It impedes the immune system from working normally.

Bleeding and blood clot risk 
Cirrhosis can increase the risk of bleeding. The liver produces various proteins in the coagulation cascade (coagulation factors II, VII, IX, X, V, and VI). When damaged, the liver is impaired in its production of these proteins. This will ultimately increase bleeding as clotting factors are diminished. Clotting function is estimated by lab values, mainly platelet count, prothrombin time (PT), and international normalized ratio (INR).

The American Gastroenterological Association (AGA) provided recommendations in 2021 in regards to coagulopathy management of cirrhotic patients in certain scenarios.
 The AGA does not recommend for extensive pre-procedural testing, including repeated measurements of PT/INR or platelet count before patients with stable cirrhosis undergo common gastrointestinal procedures. Nor do they suggest the routine use of blood products, such as platelets, for bleeding prevention. Cirrhosis is stable when there are no changes in baseline abnormalities of coagulation lab values.
 For patients with stable cirrhosis and low platelet count undergoing common low-risk procedures, the AGA does not recommend the routine use of thrombopoietin receptor agonists for bleeding prevention.
 In hospitalized patients who meet standard guidelines for clot prevention, the AGA suggests standard prevention.
 The AGA does not recommend in routine screening for portal vein thrombosis. If there is a portal vein thrombosis, the AGA suggests treatment by anticoagulation.
 In the case of cirrhosis with atrial fibrillation, the AGA recommends using anticoagulation over no anticoagulation.

Complications

Ascites
Salt restriction is often necessary, as cirrhosis leads to accumulation of salt (sodium retention). Diuretics may be necessary to suppress ascites. Diuretic options for inpatient treatment include aldosterone antagonists (spironolactone) and loop diuretics. Aldosterone antagonists are preferred for people who can take oral medications and are not in need of an urgent volume reduction. Loop diuretics can be added as additional therapy.

Where salt restriction and the use of diuretics are ineffective then paracentesis may be the preferred option. This procedure requires the insertion of a plastic tube into the peritoneal cavity. Human serum albumin solution is usually given to prevent complications from the rapid volume reduction. In addition to being more rapid than diuretics, 4–5 liters of paracentesis is more successful in comparison to diuretic therapy.

Esophageal and gastric variceal bleeding
For portal hypertension, nonselective beta blockers such as propranolol or nadolol are commonly used to lower blood pressure over the portal system. In severe complications from portal hypertension, transjugular intrahepatic portosystemic shunting (TIPS) is occasionally indicated to relieve pressure on the portal vein. As this shunting can worsen hepatic encephalopathy, it is reserved for those patients at low risk of encephalopathy. TIPS is generally regarded only as a bridge to liver transplantation or as a palliative measure. Balloon-occluded retrograde transvenous obliteration can be used to treat gastric variceal bleeding.

Gastroscopy (endoscopic examination of the esophagus, stomach, and duodenum) is performed in cases of established cirrhosis. If esophageal varices are found, prophylactic local therapy may be applied such as sclerotherapy or banding, and beta blockers may be used.

Hepatic encephalopathy
Hepatic encephalopathy is a potential complication of cirrhosis. It may lead to functional neurological impairment ranging from mild confusion to coma. Goal of treatment is reducing ammonia. This can be achieved by administering lactulose or lactitol to increase potassium. Hydration and nutritional support is also provided. Protein uptake is encouraged. The underlying cause may also need to be identified and treated. Causes include alcohol use, excess protein, gastrointestinal bleeding, infection, constipation, and vomiting/diarrhea. Drugs like benzodiazepines, diuretics, or narcotics can also precipitate hepatic encephalopathy. A low protein diet is recommended with gastrointestinal bleeding. Rifaximin is administered if mental state does not improve in 48 hours. Antibiotic treatment may need to be continued for at least 3 months. The grading or severity of hepatic encephalopathy is determined by mental status.

Hepatorenal syndrome
Hepatorenal syndrome is a serious complication of end-stage cirrhosis when kidney damage is also involved.

Spontaneous bacterial peritonitis
People with ascites due to cirrhosis are at risk of spontaneous bacterial peritonitis.

Portal hypertensive gastropathy
Portal hypertensive gastropathy refers to changes in the mucosa of the stomach in people with portal hypertension, and is associated with cirrhosis severity.

Infection
Cirrhosis can cause immune system dysfunction, leading to infection. Signs and symptoms of infection may be nonspecific and are more difficult to recognize (for example, worsening encephalopathy but no fever). Moreover, infections in cirrhosis are major triggers for other complications (ascites, variceal bleading, hepatic enecphalopathy, organ failures, death).

Hepatocellular carcinoma
Hepatocellular carcinoma is the most common primary liver cancer, and the most common cause of death in people with cirrhosis. Screening using an MRI scan can detect this cancer and is often carried out for early signs which has been shown to improve outcomes.

Epidemiology

Each year, approximately one million deaths are due to complications of cirrhosis, making cirrhosis the 11th most common cause of death globally. Cirrhosis and chronic liver disease were the tenth leading cause of death for men and the twelfth for women in the United States in 2001, killing about 27,000 people each year.

The cause of cirrhosis can vary; alcohol and non-alcoholic fatty liver disease are main causes in western and industrialized countries, whereas viral hepatitis is the predominant cause in low and middle-income countries. Cirrhosis is more common in men than in women. The cost of cirrhosis in terms of human suffering, hospital costs, and lost productivity is high.

Globally, age-standardized disability-adjusted life year (DALY) rates have decreased from 1990 to 2017, with the values going from 656.4 years per 100,000 people to 510.7 years per 100,000 people. In males DALY rates have decreased from 903.1 years per 100,000 population in 1990, to 719.3 years per 100,000 population in 2017; in females the DALY rates have decreased from 415.5 years per 100,000 population in 1990, to 307.6 years per 100,000 population in 2017. However, globally the total number of DALYs have increased by 10.9 million from 1990 to 2017, reaching the value of 41.4 million DALYs.

Etymology
"condition" in medical terminology. While the clinical entity was known before, René Laennec gave it this name in an 1819 paper.

See also 

 Liver failure

References

External links 

 Cirrhosis of the Liver at the National Digestive Diseases Information Clearinghouse (NDDIC). NIH Publication No. 04-1134, December 2003.
 

Diseases of liver
Alcohol and health
Wikipedia medicine articles ready to translate
Articles containing video clips
Wikipedia emergency medicine articles ready to translate
Disorders causing edema